Nude – Remade Remodelled is a remix album by British band Dead or Alive released one year after its companion studio album Nude. 
The album features remixes of the Nude album tracks (with the exception of "Get Out of My House", "I Cannot Carry On" and "My Forbidden Lover") by Pete Burns and Steve Coy and was released in Japan only. The album remained an exclusive in this territory until the worldwide release of the Sophisticated Boom Box MMXVI compilation box set in 2016.

The album artwork uses a variation of the European version of Nude.

Track listing
"Come Home (With Me Baby)" – 6:47
"Baby Don't Say Goodbye" – 6:30
"Stop Kicking My Heart Around" – 5:49
"I Don't Wanna Be Your Boyfriend" – 5:31
"Give It Back (That Love Is Mine)" – 5:45
"Turn Around and Count 2 Ten" – 6:33
"Come Home (With Me Baby)" (12" Version) – 6:22

References

Dead or Alive (band) compilation albums
Eurobeat albums
1991 remix albums
Epic Records remix albums